Radical 18 or radical knife meaning "knife" is one of 23 Kangxi radicals (214 radicals total) composed of 2 strokes.

When appearing at the right side of a Chinese character, it usually transforms into 刂.

In the Kangxi Dictionary, there are 377 characters (out of 49,030) to be found under this radical.

 is also the 22nd indexing component in the Table of Indexing Chinese Character Components predominantly adopted by Simplified Chinese dictionaries published in mainland China.

Evolution

Derived characters

Literature 

Leyi Li: “Tracing the Roots of Chinese Characters: 500 Cases”. Beijing 1993,

External links

Unihan Database - U+5200

018
022